The 2001–02 Scottish Cup was the 117th staging of Scotland's most prestigious football knockout competition, also known for sponsorship reasons as the Tennent's Scottish Cup. The Cup was won by Rangers who defeated Old Firm rivals Celtic in the final.

First round

Replay

Second round

Replays

Third round

Replays

Fourth round

Replay

Quarter-finals

Replays

Semi-finals

Final

Scottish Cup seasons
Scottish Cup, 2001-02
Scot